James Edgar Evins (December 31, 1883 – March 22, 1954) was an American politician. He served as a member of the Tennessee Senate. He was also the mayor of Smithville, Tennessee for 16 years. He is the namesake of Edgar Evins State Park, established in 1975 in part due to work by his son Congressman Joe L. Evins.

References

1883 births
1954 deaths
Tennessee state senators
Mayors of places in Tennessee
People from Smithville, Tennessee
20th-century American politicians